The 1940 Coppa Italia Final was the final of the 1939–40 Coppa Italia. The match was played on 15 June 1940 between Fiorentina and Genova 1893. Fiorentina won 1–0.

Match

References 
Coppa Italia 1939-40 statistics at rsssf.com
 https://www.calcio.com/calendario/ita-coppa-italia-1939/40-finale/2/
 https://www.worldfootball.net/schedule/ita-coppa-italia-1939/40-finale/2/

Coppa Italia Finals
Coppa Italia Final 1940
Genoa C.F.C. matches